Florian Sempey, born 29 January 1988, is a French operatic baritone.

Career
Florian Sempey studied piano and voice at the conservatoire in Libourne and then singing at the Bordeaux Conservatory. He made his debut at the age of 21 in the role of Papageno in Mozart's The Magic Flute at the Bordeaux Opera. He then entered the Atelier Lyrique, the young artists programme of the Paris Opera, for two years. He appeared as Figaro in Rossini's The Barber of Seville at the Paris Opera, a role which he also performed at the Royal Opera House, the Rossini Opera Festival in Pesaro, the Rome Opera and numerous other leading opera houses. He has also appeared at the Paris Opera in roles including Papageno, the Count of Nevers in Meyerbeer's Les Huguenots and Dandini in Rossini's La Cenerentola. He sang the role of Pollux in Rameau's Castor et Pollux at the Opera Comique in Paris, Valentin in Gounod's Faust with the Dutch National Opera, the title role in Ambroise Thomas' Hamlet and Alphonse XI in Donizetti's La Favorite at the Deutsche Oper Berlin  and Enrico in the same composer's Lucia di Lammermoor at Opéra d'Avignon, as well as numerous other roles at leading opera houses.
He regularly appears in a wide repertoire of concert performances both with solo piano and orchestra.

Selected recordings

Le mage, Massenet. CD:Ediciones Singulares 2013
Dardanus, Rameau. DVD:Harmonia Mundi 2016
Les pêcheurs de perles, Bizet. CD:Pentatone
Figaro in The Barber of Seville, Rossini. DVD:Naxos Cat:2110592 2019

Notes

Living people
1988 births
French operatic baritones
21st-century French male opera singers